Kahtu may refer to:
 Kahtu, Fars
 Kahtu, Kerman
 Kahtuiyeh (disambiguation)